Sandra Erica Jovel Polanco (born 24 February 1978) is a Guatemalan diplomat and government official. She served as Minister of Foreign Affairs of Guatemala from 27 August 2017, succeeding to Carlos Raúl Morales, to 14 January 2020.

Personal life 
 
In 2016, she was accused due to anomalies in adoption processes.

Career
Since 2014, Jovel has been Guatemala's Vice-Minister of international affairs in charge of trade, investments, tourism and cooperation. In May 2016, Jovel authorized the exportation from Chile to Guatemala of the Chilean mangos.

On 27 August 2017, president Morales named Jovel as successor to Carlos Raúl Morales and ordered her to immediately comply with the requirements to initiate the expulsion of the Colombian commissioner for UN's CICIG, Iván Velásquez.

On 1 February 2018, she met with Secretary-General of the United Nations António Guterres in New York City. A leaked document revealed that part of their talks was around supposed misdeeds of Iván Velásquez.

See also
List of foreign ministers in 2017

References 

1978 births
Living people
Foreign ministers of Guatemala
Women government ministers of Guatemala
Female foreign ministers
Guatemalan women diplomats
Ambassadors of Guatemala to Colombia
People from Guatemala City
21st-century Guatemalan women politicians
21st-century Guatemalan politicians
Recipients of the Order of Brilliant Star
Women ambassadors